Sornabad Rural District is a rural district (dehestan) in Hamaijan District, Sepidan County, Fars Province, Iran. At the 2006 census, its population was 3,402, in 854 families.  The rural district has 30 villages.

References 

Rural Districts of Fars Province
Sepidan County